Vishnu Unnikrishnan (born 11 March 1987) is an Indian actor and screenwriter, who works in Malayalam film industry.

Early and personal life
He was born to Unnikrishnan and Leela on 11 March 1987 at Ernakulam district in Kerala, India. He has two sisters, Lakshmi Priya and Reshmi aka Ambili.

Career
He made his film debut in the Malayalam film Ente Veedu Appuvinteyum, directed by Sibi Malayil in 2003. Since then, he has acted in numerous films. In 2015, he debuted as a screenwriter by co-writing the film Amar Akbar Anthony with Bibin George, directed by Nadirshah. In the following year, he acted in the leading role in Kattappanayile Rithwik Roshan which he co-wrote with Bibin George and was directed by Nadirshah.During the filming of the movie Street Light's his second movie in a major role he suffered an injury to his right hand which left his hand almost paralysed for months. After regular physiotherapy he recovered in a few months time to get back to do his next project Shikkari Shambhu.

Filmography

Film

Accolades
 Won: 19th Asianet Film Awards for Best Script - Kattappanayile Hrithik Roshan
 Won: Vanitha Film Awards for Best Debut (Male) - Kattappanayile Hrithik Roshan
 Nominated: SIIMA Best Debut Male -  Malayalam

References

External links

1987 births
Indian male film actors
Living people
Male actors from Kochi
Male actors in Malayalam cinema
Maharaja's College, Ernakulam alumni
Indian male television actors
Male actors in Malayalam television
21st-century Indian male actors